Colby Hall can refer to:

Buildings
 Colby Hall (Newton, Massachusetts), listed on the NRHP
 Colby Hall (Normal, Illinois), residence hall Illinois State University
 Colby Hall (Fort Worth, Texas), Colby Hall at Texas Christian University

People
 Colby Hall (writer), Mediaite managing editor

Architectural disambiguation pages